KCUA (92.5 FM, "Jack FM") is a radio station broadcasting an adult hits format. Licensed to Maeser, Utah, United States, the station is currently owned by David Barton, through licensee Country Gold Broascasting, Inc., and features programming from Cumulus Media.

History
The station went on the air as KCUA on 26 June 1990.

References

External links

CUA
Radio stations established in 1990
1990 establishments in Utah